Aleksa Janković (born 12 April 2000) is a Serbian football winger who plays for Čukarički.

References

External links
 
 
 

2000 births
Living people
Sportspeople from Požarevac
Association football forwards
Serbian footballers
FK Teleoptik players
FK Voždovac players
FK Čukarički players
Serbian SuperLiga players
Serbia under-21 international footballers